The 17th Government of the Sahrawi Arab Democratic Republic was announced by President Brahim Ghali on 14 February 2023, after he won re-election in the 2023 Sahrawi presidential election held during the 16th Congress of the POLISARIO Front. It is headed by Bouchraya Hammoudi Bayoun as Prime Minister, with this being his second consecutive term and his fourth overall.

The government only has three members out of seventeen ministers and twenty-two cabinet members. Mariam Salek Hmada became the first woman to serve as Minister of the Interior in the SADR and second in the Arab world after Raya El Hassan, who was Minister of Interior and Municipalities in Lebanon between 2019 and 2020.

On 18 February 2023, the newly-appointed ministers took their constitutional oath on the first session of the Council of Ministers.

Background
The government was formed after Brahim Ghali won a third term in the 2023 Sahrawi presidential election held during the 16th Congress of the POLISARIO Front, an election in which he faced a competitive candidate, Bachir Mustafa Sayed.

The government is legally complied to apply the National Action Program approved by the 16th Congress, which included "intensifying the armed struggle" and "strengthening the diplomatic way" as one of its points.

The government is the first one to start its mandate in a war situation since 1991, after the ceasefire was broken in 2020, leading to the Second Western Sahara War.

Council of Ministers

Presidency of the Republic

Governors

Notes

References

Cabinets established in 2023
Hammoudi Beyoun
2023 establishments in Western Sahara